Leucopogon neurophyllus, commonly known as veined beard-heath, is a species of flowering plant in the heath family Ericaceae and is endemic to Victoria in Australia. It is a dense shrub with many branches, erect, narrowly elliptic leaves, and white, tube-shaped flowers that are densely bearded inside.

Description

Taxonomy
Leucopogon neurophyllus was first formally described in 1858 by Victorian Government Botanist Ferdinand von Mueller in his Fragmenta Phytographiae Australiae, based on plant material collected at Mount William in the Grampians. The specific epithet (neurophyllus) means "nerve-leaved".

Distribution and habitat
Veined beard-heath is only found in the higher parts of the Grampians National Park and nearby peaks, where it grows in forest and rocky shrubland.

References

neurophyllus
Flora of Victoria (Australia)
Plants described in 1858
Taxa named by Ferdinand von Mueller